Minaria is a genus of flowering plants in the family Apocynaceae, first described as a genus in 2006. They are native to Brazil and Bolivia in South America.

Species

References

Apocynaceae genera
Asclepiadoideae